The 2015–16 Philadelphia Flyers season was the 49th season for the National Hockey League franchise that was established on June 5, 1967. The Flyers opened the regular season on October 8, 2015 against the Tampa Bay Lightning. This was the first season under new head coach Dave Hakstol. The Flyers finished fifth in the Metropolitan Division and seventh in the Eastern Conference, qualifying for the Stanley Cup Playoffs as the second Wild Card team in the Eastern Conference, where they would lose in the first round in six games to the Washington Capitals.

Off-season
After the Flyers failed to qualify for the playoffs for the second time in three seasons in 2014–15, head coach Craig Berube was fired. On May 18, 2015, the Flyers hired Dave Hakstol to replace Berube. Hakstol had been the University of North Dakota's head coach for the past 11 seasons, during which he had a 289–143–43 record and led the school to the NCAA tournament in each season and advanced to the Frozen Four seven times. The Flyers retained assistant coaches Ian Laperriere, Joe Mullen and Gord Murphy. Kim Dillabaugh was named goaltending coach on July 3, 2015, replacing Jeff Reese.

The Flyers signed Kontinental Hockey League defenseman Evgeny Medvedev to a one-year, $3 million contract on May 20. June 27, the first day of the draft, was a busy one for the Flyers, as they selected defenseman Ivan Provorov with the seventh overall pick while also trading the 29th and 61st overall selection for the 24th in order to select forward Travis Konecny. The next day, the Flyers made a trade to create some cap space, with the Arizona Coyotes receiving Nicklas Grossmann and acquiring the contract of Chris Pronger, while the Flyers received Sam Gagner and a conditional 2016 or 2017 draft pick. The Flyers then traded Zac Rinaldo to the Boston Bruins in exchange for a 2017 third-round pick on June 29, while re-signing Chris VandeVelde to a two-year deal. The next day, the Flyers re-signed Ryan White to a one-year deal. On July 1, the Flyers signed free-agent goaltender Michal Neuvirth to a two-year, $3.25 million contract.

Standings

Schedule and results

Preseason

|- style="text-align:center; background:#cfc;"
| 1 || September 21 || NY Islanders || 3–5 || Philadelphia || || Neuvirth || –– || 1–0–0 || 
|- style="text-align:center; background:#fcc;"
| 2 || September 21 || Philadelphia || 2–3 || NY Islanders || || Stolarz || 5,366 || 1–1–0 || 
|- style="text-align:center; background:#cfc;"
| 3 || September 22 || NY Rangers || 3–5 || Philadelphia || || Mason || 16,985 || 2–1–0 || 
|- style="text-align:center; background:#cfc;"
| 4 || September 25 || NY Islanders || 2–5 || Philadelphia ||  || Mason || 17,369 || 3–1–0 || 
|- style="text-align:center; background:#ffc;"
| 5 || September 28 || Philadelphia || 2–3 || NY Rangers || OT || Mason || 18,006 || 3–1–1 || 
|- style="text-align:center; background:#fcc;"
| 6 || September 30 || New Jersey || 4–2 || Philadelphia ||  || Neuvirth || 17,732 || 3–2–1 || 
|- style="text-align:center; background:#ffc;"
| 7 || October 2 || Philadelphia || 2–3 || New Jersey || SO || Mason || 9,235 || 3–2–2 || 
|-
| colspan="10" style="text-align:center;"|
Notes:
 – Indicates split-squad game.
 – Game was played at PPL Center in Allentown, Pennsylvania.
|-

|-
| Legend:

Regular season

|- style="text-align:center; background:#ffc;"
| 1 || October 8 || Philadelphia || 2–3 || Tampa Bay || OT || Mason || 19,092 || 0–0–1 || 1 || 
|- style="text-align:center; background:#fcc;"
| 2 || October 10 || Philadelphia || 1–7 || Florida ||  || Mason || 19,434 || 0–1–1 || 1 || 
|- style="text-align:center; background:#cfc;"
| 3 || October 12 || Florida || 0–1 || Philadelphia ||  || Neuvirth || 19,769 || 1–1–1 || 3 || 
|- style="text-align:center; background:#cfc;"
| 4 || October 14 || Chicago || 0–3 || Philadelphia ||  || Neuvirth || 19,779 || 2–1–1 || 5 || 
|- style="text-align:center; background:#fcc;"
| 5 || October 20 || Dallas || 2–1 || Philadelphia ||  || Mason || 19,077 || 2–2–1 || 5 || 
|- style="text-align:center; background:#cfc;"
| 6 || October 21 || Philadelphia || 5–4 || Boston || OT || Mason || 17,565 || 3–2–1 || 7 || 
|- style="text-align:center; background:#cfc;"
| 7 || October 24 || NY Rangers || 2–3 || Philadelphia || SO || Mason || 19,805 || 4–2–1 || 9 || 
|- style="text-align:center; background:#ffc;"
| 8 || October 27 || Buffalo || 4–3 || Philadelphia || OT || Mason || 19,432 || 4–2–2 || 10 || 
|- style="text-align:center; background:#fcc;"
| 9 || October 29 || New Jersey || 4–1 || Philadelphia ||  || Mason || 19,241 || 4–3–2 || 10 || 
|- style="text-align:center; background:#fcc;"
| 10 || October 30 || Philadelphia || 1–3 || Buffalo ||  || Neuvirth || 15,962 || 4–4–2 || 10 || 
|-

|- style="text-align:center; background:#fcc;"
| 11 || November 2 || Philadelphia || 1–4 || Vancouver ||  || Mason || 18,264 || 4–5–2 || 10 || 
|- style="text-align:center; background:#fcc;"
| 12 || November 3 || Philadelphia || 2–4 || Edmonton ||  || Neuvirth || 16,839 || 4–6–2 || 10 || 
|- style="text-align:center; background:#ffc;"
| 13 || November 5 || Philadelphia || 1–2 || Calgary || OT || Neuvirth || 19,289 || 4–6–3 || 11 || 
|- style="text-align:center; background:#cfc;"
| 14 || November 7 || Philadelphia || 3–0 || Winnipeg ||  || Neuvirth || 15,294 || 5–6–3 || 13 || 
|- style="text-align:center; background:#fcc;"
| 15 || November 10 || Colorado || 4–0 || Philadelphia ||  || Neuvirth || 18,587 || 5–7–3 || 13 || 
|- style="text-align:center; background:#fcc;"
| 16 || November 12 || Washington || 5–2 || Philadelphia ||  || Mason || 19,414 || 5–8–3 || 13 || 
|- style="text-align:center; background:#cfc;"
| 17 || November 14 || Philadelphia || 3–2 || Carolina || OT || Mason || 13,758 || 6–8–3 || 15 || 
|- style="text-align:center; background:#ffc;"
| 18 || November 17 || Los Angeles || 3–2 || Philadelphia || SO || Mason || 18,846 || 6–8–4 || 16 || 
|- style="text-align:center; background:#ffc;"
| 19 || November 19 || San Jose || 1–0 || Philadelphia || OT || Mason || 18,229 || 6–8–5 || 17 || 
|- style="text-align:center; background:#fcc;"
| 20 || November 21 || Philadelphia || 0–4 || Ottawa ||  || Mason || 18,578 || 6–9–5 || 17 || 
|- style="text-align:center; background:#cfc;"
| 21 || November 23 || Carolina || 2–3 || Philadelphia || OT || Neuvirth || 18,636 || 7–9–5 || 19 || 
|- style="text-align:center; background:#fcc;"
| 22 || November 25 || Philadelphia || 1–3 || NY Islanders ||  || Mason || 13,027 || 7–10–5 || 19 || 
|- style="text-align:center; background:#cfc;"
| 23 || November 27 || Nashville || 2–3 || Philadelphia || OT || Neuvirth || 19,818 || 8–10–5 || 21 || 
|- style="text-align:center; background:#cfc;"
| 24 || November 28 || Philadelphia || 3–0 || NY Rangers ||  || Mason || 18,006 || 9–10–5 || 23 || 
|-

|- style="text-align:center; background:#cfc;"
| 25 || December 1 || Philadelphia || 4–2 || Ottawa ||  || Mason || 17,010 || 10–10–5 || 25 || 
|- style="text-align:center; background:#cfc;"
| 26 || December 4 || Philadelphia || 4–3 || New Jersey || OT || Neuvirth || 14,825 || 11–10–5 || 27 || 
|- style="text-align:center; background:#fcc;"
| 27 || December 5 || Columbus || 4–1 || Philadelphia ||  || Mason || 18,202 || 11–11–5 || 27 || 
|- style="text-align:center; background:#ffc;"
| 28 || December 8 || NY Islanders || 4–3 || Philadelphia || SO || Neuvirth || 18,108 || 11–11–6 || 28 || 
|- style="text-align:center; background:#cfc;"
| 29 || December 10 || Philadelphia || 4–2 || St. Louis ||  || Neuvirth || 14,428 || 12–11–6 || 30 || 
|- style="text-align:center; background:#fcc;"
| 30 || December 11 || Philadelphia || 1–3 || Dallas ||  || Neuvirth || 18,532 || 12–12–6 || 30 || 
|- style="text-align:center; background:#cfc;"
| 31 || December 15 || Carolina || 3–4 || Philadelphia || OT || Neuvirth || 18,205 || 13–12–6 || 32 || 
|- style="text-align:center; background:#cfc;"
| 32 || December 17 || Vancouver || 0–2 || Philadelphia ||  || Mason || 17,943 || 14–12–6 || 34 || 
|- style="text-align:center; background:#ffc;"
| 33 || December 19 || Philadelphia || 2–3 || Columbus || SO || Mason || 14,030 || 14–12–7 || 35 || 
|- style="text-align:center; background:#cfc;"
| 34 || December 21 || St. Louis || 3–4 || Philadelphia ||  || Mason || 19,676 || 15–12–7 || 37 || 
|- style="text-align:center; background:#fcc;"
| 35 || December 27 || Philadelphia || 2–4 || Anaheim ||  || Mason || 17,322 || 15–13–7 || 37 || 
|- style="text-align:center; background:#fcc;"
| 36 || December 30 || Philadelphia || 2–4 || San Jose ||  || Mason || 17,562 || 15–14–7 || 37 || 
|-

|- style="text-align:center; background:#fcc;"
| 37 || January 2 || Philadelphia || 1–2 || Los Angeles ||  || Neuvirth || 18,230 || 15–15–7 || 37 || 
|- style="text-align:center; background:#cfc;"
| 38 || January 5 || Montreal || 3–4 || Philadelphia ||  || Neuvirth || 19,163 || 16–15–7 || 39 || 
|- style="text-align:center; background:#cfc;"
| 39 || January 7 || Philadelphia || 4–3 || Minnesota || OT || Mason || 19,125 || 17–15–7 || 41 || 
|- style="text-align:center; background:#cfc;"
| 40 || January 9 || NY Islanders || 0–4 || Philadelphia ||  || Mason || 19,874 || 18–15–7 || 43 || 
|- style="text-align:center; background:#cfc;"
| 41 || January 13 || Boston || 2–3 || Philadelphia ||  || Mason || 19,704 || 19–15–7 || 45 || 
|- style="text-align:center; background:#ffc;"
| 42 || January 16 || NY Rangers || 3–2 || Philadelphia || SO || Mason || 19,843 || 19–15–8 || 46 || 
|- style="text-align:center; background:#cfc;"
| 43 || January 17 || Philadelphia || 2–1 || Detroit || SO || Neuvirth || 20,027 || 20–15–8 || 48 || 
|- style="text-align:center; background:#fcc;"
| 44 || January 19 || Toronto || 3–2 || Philadelphia ||  || Mason || 19,319 || 20–16–8 || 48 || 
|- style="text-align:center; background:#fcc;"
| 45 || January 21 || Philadelphia || 3–4 || Pittsburgh ||  || Mason || 18,652 || 20–17–8 || 48 || 
|- style="text-align:center; background:#ccc;"
| – || January 23 || Philadelphia ||  || NY Islanders ||colspan="6" | Game rescheduled to April 10 due to hazardous weather.
|- style="text-align:center; background:#fcc;"
| 46 || January 25 || Boston || 3–2 || Philadelphia ||  || Neuvirth || 19,738 || 20–18–8 || 48 || 
|- style="text-align:center; background:#cfc;"
| 47 || January 27 || Philadelphia || 4–3 || Washington || OT || Neuvirth || 18,506 || 21–18–8 || 50 || 
|-

|- style="text-align:center; background:#cfc;"
| 48 || February 2 || Montreal || 2–4 || Philadelphia ||  || Mason || 19,031 || 22–18–8 || 52 || 
|- style="text-align:center; background:#cfc;"
| 49 || February 4 || Philadelphia || 6–3 || Nashville ||  || Mason || 17,113 || 23–18–8 || 54 || 
|- style="text-align:center; background:#ffc;"
| 50 || February 6 || NY Rangers || 3–2 || Philadelphia || SO || Mason || 19,819 || 23–18–9 || 55 || 
|- style="text-align:center; background:#fcc;"
| 51 || February 7 || Philadelphia || 2–3 || Washington ||  || Mason || 18,506 || 23–19–9 || 55 || 
|- style="text-align:center; background:#fcc;"
| 52 || February 9 || Anaheim || 4–1 || Philadelphia ||  || Mason || 18,717 || 23–20–9 || 55 || 
|- style="text-align:center; background:#cfc;"
| 53 || February 11 || Buffalo || 1–5 || Philadelphia ||  || Mason || 19,019 || 24–20–9 || 57 || 
|- style="text-align:center; background:#ffc;"
| 54 || February 13 || New Jersey || 2–1 || Philadelphia || OT || Neuvirth || 19,775 || 24–20–10 || 58 || 
|- style="text-align:center; background:#fcc;"
| 55 || February 14 || Philadelphia || 1–3 || NY Rangers ||  || Mason || 18,006 || 24–21–10 || 58 || 
|- style="text-align:center; background:#cfc;"
| 56 || February 16 || Philadelphia || 6–3 || New Jersey ||  || Neuvirth || 15,482 || 25–21–10 || 60 || 
|- style="text-align:center; background:#ffc;"
| 57 || February 19 || Philadelphia || 2–3 || Montreal || SO || Neuvirth || 21,288 || 25–21–11 || 61 || 
|- style="text-align:center; background:#cfc;"
| 58 || February 20 || Philadelphia || 5–4 || Toronto || OT || Neuvirth || 19,060 || 26–21–11 || 63 || 
|- style="text-align:center; background:#fcc;"
| 59 || February 23 || Philadelphia || 1–3 || Carolina ||  || Neuvirth || 10,896 || 26–22–11 || 63 || 
|- style="text-align:center; background:#cfc;"
| 60 || February 25 || Minnesota || 2–3 || Philadelphia ||  || Neuvirth || 18,631 || 27–22–11 || 65 || 
|- style="text-align:center; background:#cfc;"
| 61 || February 27 || Arizona || 2–4 || Philadelphia ||  || Neuvirth || 19,773 || 28–22–11 || 67 || 
|- style="text-align:center; background:#cfc;"
| 62 || February 29 || Calgary || 3–5 || Philadelphia ||  || Neuvirth || 19,065 || 29–22–11 || 69 || 
|-

|- style="text-align:center; background:#fcc;"
| 63 || March 3 || Edmonton || 4–0 || Philadelphia ||  || Neuvirth || 18,636 || 29–23–11 || 69 || 
|- style="text-align:center; background:#cfc;"
| 64 || March 5 || Columbus || 0–6 || Philadelphia ||  || Mason || 19,645 || 30–23–11 || 71 || 
|- style="text-align:center; background:#cfc;"
| 65 || March 7 || Tampa Bay || 2–4 || Philadelphia ||  || Mason || 17,906 || 31–23–11 || 73 || 
|- style="text-align:center; background:#cfc;"
| 66 || March 11 || Philadelphia || 3–1 || Tampa Bay ||  || Mason || 19,092 || 32–23–11 || 75 || 
|- style="text-align:center; background:#ffc;"
| 67 || March 12 || Philadelphia || 4–5 || Florida || SO || Mason || 19,404 || 32–23–12 || 76 || 
|- style="text-align:center; background:#cfc;"
| 68 || March 15 || Detroit || 3–4 || Philadelphia ||  || Mason || 19,806 || 33–23–12 || 78 || 
|- style="text-align:center; background:#cfc;"
| 69 || March 16 || Philadelphia || 3–2 || Chicago ||  || Neuvirth || 22,113 || 34–23–12 || 80 || 
|- style="text-align:center; background:#fcc;"
| 70 || March 19 || Pittsburgh || 4–1 || Philadelphia ||  || Mason || 19,967 || 34–24–12 || 80 || 
|- style="text-align:center; background:#cfc;"
| 71 || March 21 || Philadelphia || 4–1 || NY Islanders ||  || Mason || 14,329 || 35–24–12 || 82 || 
|- style="text-align:center; background:#ffc;"
| 72 || March 22 || Philadelphia || 2–3 || Columbus || SO || Mason || 16,230 || 35–24–13 || 83 || 
|- style="text-align:center; background:#cfc;"
| 73 || March 24 || Philadelphia || 4–2 || Colorado ||  || Mason || 18,087 || 36–24–13 || 85 || 
|- style="text-align:center; background:#fcc;"
| 74 || March 26 || Philadelphia || 1–2 || Arizona ||  || Mason || 16,002 || 36–25–13 || 85 || 
|- style="text-align:center; background:#cfc;"
| 75 || March 28 || Winnipeg || 2–3 || Philadelphia || OT || Mason || 19,100 || 37–25–13 || 87 || 
|- style="text-align:center; background:#cfc;"
| 76 || March 30 || Washington || 1–2 || Philadelphia || SO || Mason || 19,850 || 38–25–13 || 89 || 
|-

|- style="text-align:center; background:#cfc;"
| 77|| April 2 || Ottawa || 2–3 || Philadelphia ||  || Mason || 19,578 || 39–25–13 || 91 || 
|- style="text-align:center; background:#fcc;"
| 78 || April 3 || Philadelphia || 2–6 || Pittsburgh ||  || Mason || 18,673 || 39–26–13 || 91 || 
|- style="text-align:center; background:#fcc;"
| 79 || April 6 || Philadelphia || 0–3 || Detroit ||  || Mason || 20,027 || 39–27–13 || 91 || 
|- style="text-align:center; background:#ffc;"
| 80 || April 7 || Toronto || 4–3 || Philadelphia || OT || Mason || 19,674 || 39–27–14 || 92 || 
|- style="text-align:center; background:#cfc;"
| 81 || April 9 || Pittsburgh || 1–3 || Philadelphia ||  || Mason || 19,919 || 40–27–14 || 94 || 
|- style="text-align:center; background:#cfc;"
| 82 || April 10 || Philadelphia || 5–2 || NY Islanders ||  || Neuvirth || 14,244 || 41–27–14 || 96 || 
|-

|-
| Legend:

Playoffs

|- style="text-align:center; background:#fcc;"
| 1 || April 14 || Philadelphia || 0–2 || Washington || || Mason || 18,506 || 0–1 || 
|- style="text-align:center; background:#fcc;"
| 2 || April 16 || Philadelphia || 1–4 || Washington || || Mason || 18,506 || 0–2 || 
|- style="text-align:center; background:#fcc;"
| 3 || April 18 || Washington || 6–1 || Philadelphia || || Mason || 19,678 || 0–3 || 
|- style="text-align:center; background:#cfc;"
| 4 || April 20 || Washington || 1–2 || Philadelphia || || Neuvirth || 19,692 || 1–3 || 
|-  style="text-align:center; background:#cfc;"
| 5 || April 22 || Philadelphia || 2–0 || Washington || || Neuvirth || 18,506  || 2–3 || 
|- style="text-align:center; background:#fcc;"
| 6 || April 24 || Washington || 1–0 || Philadelphia || || Neuvirth || 19,925 || 2–4 || 
|-

|-
| Legend:

Player statistics

Scoring
 Position abbreviations: C = Center; D = Defense; G = Goaltender; LW = Left Wing; RW = Right Wing
  = Joined team via a transaction (e.g., trade, waivers, signing) during the season. Stats reflect time with the Flyers only.
  = Left team via a transaction (e.g., trade, waivers, release) during the season. Stats reflect time with the Flyers only.

Goaltending

Awards and records

Awards

Records

Shayne Gostisbehere set a number of team records during the 2015–16 season. Gostisbehere‘s 15-game point streak from January 19 to February 20 is the team record for a rookie and the NHL record for a rookie defenseman, and his nine-game assist streak from January 21 to February 11 tied the team record for a rookie.  He set franchise single season highs for goals by a rookie defenseman (17) and overtime goals (4), and tied the team record for powerplay goals by a defenseman (8).

Milestones

Suspensions and fines

Transactions
The Flyers were involved in the following transactions from June 16, 2015, the day after the deciding game of the 2015 Stanley Cup Finals, through June 12, 2016, the day of the deciding game of the 2016 Stanley Cup Finals.

Trades

Players acquired

Players lost

Signings

Draft picks

Below are the Philadelphia Flyers' selections made at the 2015 NHL Entry Draft, held on June 26–27, 2015 at the BB&T Center in Sunrise, Florida. The Flyers original second and third-round picks were traded in two different trades.

Notes

References
General
 
 
 
Specific

Philadelphia Flyers seasons
Philadelphia Flyers season, 2015-16
Philadelphia
Philadelphia